The Koalisyon ng Daang Matuwid (Lit.: Coalition of the Right Path) was the umbrella of the administration-backed presidential and senatorial line-up for the 2016 Philippine Senate election. It is composed  mostly of supporters of Mar Roxas, who announced his presidential bid after the endorsement of Philippine President Benigno Aquino III during the event at the Club Filipino in July 2015. It is the remnant of Team PNoy which was formed by the Liberal Party along with Akbayan Citizens Action Party, Laban ng Demokratikong Pilipino, the Nacionalista Party, the Nationalist People's Coalition and the National Unity Party as its coalition members.

Their defeat in the presidential elections rendered the alliance nonexistent as they became the opposition bloc in the Senate, while most of the Liberal Party members in the House of Representatives joined the government-backed Coalition for Change. It was succeeded by Otso Diretso for the 2019 Philippine Senate election with 8 candidates announced in December 2018.

History

2016 Elections

A few days after his final SONA, Pres. Aquino endorsed Sec. Mar Roxas to be their standard bearer in 2016, after Sen. Grace Poe failed to agree to be Aquino's presidential bet in 2016, and instead she preferred to be Roxas' running mate, pitting against Jejomar Binay - Gregorio Honasan tandem.

Vice Presidential nominee

After Roxas had officially announced his candidacy in October 2015, he chooses incumbent Camarines Sur 3rd District Representative Leni Robredo, widow of former DILG Secretary Jesse Robredo as his vice presidential candidate at the Club Filipino where she accepted.

Senatorial slate

Results
7 out of the 12 candidates under the Koalisyon ng Daang Matuwid won a seat in the Senate.

References

2015 establishments in the Philippines
Defunct political party alliances in the Philippines
Presidency of Benigno Aquino III